Allothymoites is a genus of East Asian comb-footed spiders that was first described by H. Ono in 2007.  it contains three species, found in Japan and China: A. kumadai, A. repandus, and A. sculptilis.

See also
 List of Theridiidae species

References

Araneomorphae genera
Spiders of Asia
Theridiidae